Rose Hill Cemetery, located in Hagerstown, Maryland, is the oldest public cemetery in Washington County Maryland. The cemetery features over 102 acres of burial space and is the final resting place of over 43,000 individuals.

The cemetery was established on land originally granted to the Wroe family by King George III in the 1700s.  Dr. John A. Wroe and his wife purchased the land. Their home was on a hill called Wroe's Hill. In 1865, William T. Hamilton and a group of individuals established the Hagerstown Cemetery Association and in 1866 purchased land needed to establish the area's first public cemetery and chartered the cemetery as Rose Hill Cemetery of Hagerstown.

Cemetery within the cemetery
The Washington Confederate Cemetery was bought by the state of Maryland in 1871. The cemetery has 2,467 Confederate soldiers from the Battle of Antietam. Only 346 soldiers graves were identified.

Notable interments
 Alexander Armstrong (1877–1939), Attorney General of Maryland and Republican candidate for governor
 George Bell (brigadier general)
 William Thomas Hamilton
 William Preston Lane, Jr
 John Thomson Mason, Jr
 Hiram Percy Maxim
 Louis Emory McComas
 James Dixon Roman
 Robert Lawson Rose
 William O. Wilson

References

External links
 Rose Hill Cemetery – official site
 
 

 
Cemeteries in Maryland
Protected areas of Washington County, Maryland
Buildings and structures in Hagerstown, Maryland
1866 establishments in Maryland